Statistics of the Primera División de México for the 1967–68 season.

Overview

Pachuca was promoted to Primera División.

The season was contested by 16 teams, and Toluca won the championship and becomes second team to win consecutive championships.

Morelia was relegated to Segunda División.

Teams

League standings

Results

References
Mexico - List of final tables (RSSSF)

1967-68
Mex
1967–68 in Mexican football